"Get Out of My Life, Woman" is a song written by Allen Toussaint and first recorded by Lee Dorsey.  It reached number five on the U.S. Billboard R&B chart and number 44 on the Hot 100 singles chart in 1966.

Background
In a song review for AllMusic, Mark Deming commented on the lyrics: "In short, the song is about as prototypical as R&B gets, though Lee Dorsey's great vocal performance and Allen Toussaint's expert arrangement give their version a distinctive edge".

Other artists have also adapted the song, including Paul Butterfield, the Leaves, Solomon Burke, Iron Butterfly, the Kingsmen, Roy Head, and Freddie King, according to Deming. In a review of the Paul Butterfield Blues Band album East-West (1966), he commented "highlights came when the band pushed into new territory, such as the taut New Orleans proto-funk of 'Get Out of My Life, Woman'".

Chart performance

References

1965 songs
1965 singles
1968 singles
Songs written by Allen Toussaint
Lee Dorsey songs
Solomon Burke songs
Iron Butterfly songs
The Kingsmen songs
Freddie King songs